The People's Mojahedin Organization of Iran (PMOI), also known as Mojahedin-e-Khalq (MEK) or Mojahedin-e-Khalq Organization (MKO), is an Iranian political-militant organization. It advocates overthrowing the Government of the Islamic Republic of Iran and installing its own government. Its revolutionary interpretation of Islam contrasts with the conservative Islam of the traditional clergy as well as the populist version developed by Ayatollah Khomeini in the 1970s. It is also Iran's largest and most active political opposition group.

The MEK was founded on 5 September 1965 by leftist Iranian students affiliated with the Freedom Movement of Iran to oppose the U.S.-backed Shah Mohammad Reza Pahlavi. The organization engaged in armed conflict with the Pahlavi dynasty in the 1970s and contributed to the overthrow of the Shah during the 1979 Iranian Revolution. It subsequently pursued the establishment of a democracy in Iran, particularly gaining support from Iran's middle class intelligentsia. After the fall of Pahlavi, the MEK boycotted the December 1979 Iranian constitutional referendum and Khomeini prevented Massoud Rajavi and other MEK members from running for office. By 1981, authorities had banned the MEK and begun a major crackdown on the group's members and supporters, driving the organization underground.

In June 1981, the MEK organized the 20 June 1981 Iranian protests against the Islamic Republic in support of president Abolhassan Banisadr, claiming that the Islamic Republic had carried out a secret coup d'état. Afterwards, the government arrested and executed numerous MEK members and sympathizers. As the Iran regime started to clamp down on civil and human rights, the MEK initiated attacks targeting the clerical leadership that lasted until 1982.

In 1983, the MEK started an alliance with Iraq following a meeting between Massoud Rajavi and Tariq Aziz. In 1986, the Islamic Republic of Iran (IRI) requested France to expel the MEK from its base in Paris, so in response, it re-established its base in Iraq. The MEK then sided with Iraq during the Iran-Iraq war taking part in several operations against the Islamic Republic. It was involved in Operation Mersad, Operation Forty Stars, Operation Shining Sun and the suppression of the 1991 uprisings in Iraq. Following Operation Mersad, Iranian officials ordered the execution of thousands of political prisoners said to support the MEK.

In 2002, the MEK was a source for claims about the nuclear program of Iran. Following the occupation of Iraq by U.S.-led coalition forces in 2003, the MEK signed a ceasefire agreement with the U.S. and put down their arms in Camp Ashraf. The European Union, Canada, the United States, and Japan have previously listed the MEK as a terrorist organization. The MEK is designated as a terrorist organization by Iran and Iraq. 

In June 2004, the U.S. designated MEK members in Camp Ashraf ‘protected persons’ under the Fourth Geneva Convention, relative to the Protection of Civilian Persons in Time of War which expired in 2009 after the attainment of the full sovereignty of Iraq. Its critics have described the group as "resembling a cult", while its backers describe the group as proponents of "a free and democratic Iran" that could become the next government there.

Other names 
The group had no name until February 1972.

The People's Mojahedin Organization of Iran is known by a variety of names including:
 Mojahedin-e-Khalq Organization (MEK or PMOI)
 The National Liberation Army of Iran (NLA) – the group's armed wing
 National Council of Resistance of Iran (NCRI) – the MEK is the founding member of a coalition of organizations called the NCRI. The organization has the appearance of a broad-based coalition; many analysts consider NCRI and MEK to be synonymous and recognize NCRI as an only "nominally independent" political wing of MEK.
 Monafiqeen – the Iranian government consistently refers to the organization with this derogatory name. The term is derived from the Quran, which describes it as people of "two minds" who "say with their mouths what is not in their hearts" and "in their hearts is a disease".

History

Establishment

The MEK was founded on 5 September 1965 by leftist Iranian students affiliated with the Freedom Movement of Iran to oppose the Shah Pahlavi. Mohammad Hanifnejad, Saeed Mohsen and Ali Asghar Badizadegan are mentioned as the founders of the MEK. The MEK was the first Iranian organization to systematically develop a modern revolutionary interpretation of Islam.

The MEK opposed the rule of the Shah, considering him corrupt and oppressive, and considered the mainstream Liberation Movement too moderate and ineffective. Although the MEK are often regarded as devotees of Ali Shariati, in fact, their pronouncements preceded Shariati's, and they continued to echo each other throughout the late 1960s and the early 1970s. Its members mainly belonged to the Iranian intelligentsia, particularly the salaried middle class, college students, teachers, civil servants, and other professionals. According to Ervand Abrahamian, the MEK's "modernist interpretation of Islam appealed to the educated youth, who, while still culturally attached to Islam, rejected its old-fashioned clerical interpretations". Unlike the clergy, it accepted Western concepts (especially in the social sciences).

Early years (1965–1971)

In its first five years, the group primarily engaged in ideological work. According to Ervand Abrahamian, their thinking aligned with what was a common tendency in Iran at the time – a kind of radical, political Islam based on a Marxist reading of history and politics. The group's main source of inspiration was the Islamic text Nahj al-Balagha, a collection of analyses and aphorisms attributed to Ali ibn Abi Talib. Despite some describing a Marxist influence, the group never used the terms "socialist" or "communist" to describe themselves. During the 1970s, the MEK propagated radical Islam through some of Ali Shariati's works (as opposed to their own publications, which were banned in Iran at the time). The MEK (and Shariati) claimed that Islam should oppose feudalism and capitalism; should eradicate inhumane practices; should treat all as equal citizens, and should socialize the means of production. The MEK also adopted elements of Marxism in order to update and modernize their interpretation of radical Islam.

According to Jamestown Foundation the MEK tried to kidnap the U.S. Ambassador to Iran Douglas MacArthur II in 1970. Some sources attribute the attempted kidnap to other groups. 

By August 1971, the MEK's Central Committee included Reza Rezai, Kazem Zolanvar, and Brahram Aram. Up until the death of the then leader of the MEK in June 1973, Reza Rezai, there was no doubt about the group's Islamic identity. During August–September 1971, SAVAK managed to strike a great blow to the MEK, arresting many members and executing the senior members, including its co-founders. SAVAK had severely shattered MEK's organizational structure, and the surviving leadership and key members of the organization were kept in prisons until three weeks before the revolution, when political prisoners were released.

Some surviving members restructured the group by replacing the central cadre with a three-man central committee. Each of the three central committee members led a separate branch of the organization with their cells independently storing their own weapons and recruiting new members. Two of the original central committee members were replaced in 1972 and 1973, and the replacing members were in charge of leading the organization until the internal purge of 1975.

Schism (1971–1978)

By 1973, the members of the Marxist–Leninist MEK launched an "internal ideological struggle". Members who did not convert to Marxism were expelled or reported to SAVAK. This new group adopted a Marxist, more secular and extremist identity. They appropriated the MEK name, and in a book entitled Manifesto on Ideological Issues, the central leadership declared "that after ten years of secret existence, four years of armed struggle, and two years of intense ideological rethinking, they had reached the conclusion that Marxism, not Islam, was the true revolutionary philosophy".

This led to two rival Mojahedin, each with its own publication, its own organization, and its own activities. The new group was known initially as the Mojahedin M.L. (Marxist–Leninist). A few months before the Iranian Revolution, the majority of the Marxist Mojahedin renamed themselves Peykar (Organization of Struggle for the Emancipation of the Working Class) on 7 December 1978 (16 Azar, 1357). This name derived from the League of Struggle for the Emancipation of the Working Class, which had been a left-wing group in Saint Petersburg, founded by Vladimir Lenin in the autumn of 1895. Later, during the Iranian revolution, Peykar merged with some Maoist groups. From 1973 to 1979, the Muslim MEK survived partly in the provinces but mainly in prisons, particularly Qasr Prison where Massoud Rajavi was held.

In August 1971, the Shah's security services arrested 69 members of the MEK, with additional arrests and executions following in 1972 that "practically shattered the organization". Further infighting within the organization followed, with a breakaway group highjacking the MEK name and identity. Other analysts support this, including director of research at the Washington Institute for Near East Policy, Patrick Clawson, claiming that "Rajavi, upon release from prison during the revolution, had to rebuild the organization, which had been badly battered by the Peykar experience".

The group conducted several assassinations of U.S. military personnel and civilians working in Iran during the 1970s. Between 1973 and 1975, the Marxist–Leninist MEK increased their armed operations in Iran. In 1973, they engaged in two street battles with Tehran police and bombed ten buildings including Plan Organization, Pan-American Airlines, Shell Oil Company, Hotel International, Radio City Cinema, and an export company owned by a Baha’i businessman. In February 1974, they attacked a police station in Isfahan and in April, they bombed a reception hall, Oman Bank, gates of the British embassy, and offices of Pan-American Oil company in protest of the Sultan of Oman's state visit. A communiqué by the organization declared that their actions had been to show solidarity with the people of Dhofar. On 19 April 1974, they attempted to bomb the SAVAK centre at Tehran University. On 25 May, they set off bombs at three multinational corporations.

Lt. Col. Louis Lee Hawkins, a U.S. Army comptroller, was shot dead in front of his home in Tehran by two men on a motorcycle on 2 June 1973. A car carrying three American employees of Rockwell International was attacked by MEK in August 1976. William Cottrell, Donald Smith, and Robert Krongard were killed working on the Ibex system. Leading up to the Islamic Revolution, members of the MEK conducted attacks and assassinations against both Iranian and Western targets.  In May 1972, an attack on Brig. Gen. Harold Price was attributed to the MEK. 
The MEK was one of the supporters of the occupation of the American embassy in Tehran after the Iranian revolution. MEK described the eventual release of the American hostages a "surrender"
According to George Cave, CIA's former Chief of Station in Tehran, MEK hit squad members impersonated road workers and buried an improvised explosive device under the road that Brig. Gen. Harold Price regularly used. When he was spotted, the operative detonated the bomb, destroying the vehicle and disabling Price for the rest of his life. Cave states that it was the first instance of remotely detonating that kind of bomb.

Vahid Afrakhteh, a founding member of Peykar, confessed to the killings of Americans, and later was executed. Bahram Aram and Vahid Afrakhteh both belonged to the (Marxist) rival splinter group Peykar that emerged in 1972, and not the (Muslim) MEK. Despite this, some sources have attributed these assassinations to the MEK.

In 2005, the Department of State also attributed the assassinations of Americans in Iran to Peykar. The Country Reports issued in April 2006 stated: "A Marxist element of the MEK murdered several of the Shah's US security advisers prior to the Islamic Revolution".

1979 Iranian Revolution

By early 1979, the MEK had organized themselves and recreated armed cells, especially in Tehran. The MEK (together with other guerilla organizations) helped overthrow the Pahlavi regime. Le Monde reported that "In the course of two decisive and dramatic days, the guerilla organizations, both Marxist and non-Marxist, had managed to bring down the Pahlavi monarchy". Ayandegan, the independent mass circulation daily, wrote that it had been predominantly the Feda'iyan and the MEK who had defeated the Imperial Guards. In January 1979, Massoud Rajavi was released from prison and rebuilt the MEK together with other members that had been imprisoned with him at Qar,  and Kayhan, the mass circulation evening paper, said that the MEK, the Feda'iyan and other left-wing guerillas had played the decisive role in the final battles of 11 February.

The first person to speak at length on national television immediately after the revolution was the father of three members of MEK who had been killed, Khalilollah Rezai. One of the first persons to address Iran on Radio Tehran was a MEK spokesman who congratulated the country for the revolution and hailed "His highness Ayatollah Khomeini as a glorious mojahed". The MEK had managed to emerge from the underground onto the public arena, although it would soon enter into conflict with Khomeini. Asghar Ali described the MEK as "using [Islam] for serving the exploited masses". The author said that although the MEK lacked the prestige of Khomeini, they were "certainly fighting the poor and downtrodden, giving Islam a radical image".

1979 post-revolution
After the Islamic Revolution, the MEK grew quickly, becoming "a major force in Iranian politics" according to Ervand Abrahamian. The MEK represented Islamic leftists who had fought the Shah's regime independently of Ayatollah Khomeini, and later the MEK drew strong public support after the revolution and became a leading opposition to the new theocratic regime.

The group supported the revolution in its initial phases. Its candidate for the head of the newly founded council of experts was Massoud Rajavi in the referendum of August 1979. He was not elected. It has also been suggested that the group supported the U.S. embassy takeover in Tehran in 1979. According to Ervand Abrahamian and Kenneth Katzman, the MEK "could not have supported the hostage taking because the regime used the hostage crises as excuse to eliminate its internal opponents".
The MEK further launched an unsuccessful campaign supporting total abolition of Iran's standing military, the Islamic Republic of Iran Army, in order to prevent a coup d'état against the system. They also claimed credit for infiltration against the Nojeh coup plot.

Khomeini did not like the MEK's philosophy, which Steven O'Hern describes as "combined Marxist theories of social evolution and class struggle with a view of Shiite Islam that suggested Shiite clerics had misinterpreted Islam and had been collaborators with the ruling class", and after the fall of the Shah, Khomeini had little use for the MEK.

December 1979 referendum to 1981

The MEK refused to participate in the December 1979 Iranian constitutional referendum organized by the Islamic Republican Party to ratify the Constitution drafted by the Assembly of Experts. The MEK was joined in its boycott by other groups that opposed the new constitution, including the People's Fedayeen and the Muslim People's Republican Party. Despite the opposition, the 3 December 1979 referendum vote approved the new constitution.

The MEK argued that the new constitution had "failed to set up proper councils, nationalize foreign holdings, guarantee equal treatment to all nationalities, give 'land to the tiller', place a ceiling on agricultural holdings and accept the concept of the classless tawhidi society". Once the constitution had been ratified, the MEK proposed Rajavi as their presidential candidate. In his campaign, Rajavi promised to rectify the constitution's shortcomings.

As a result of the boycott, Khomeini subsequently published a fatwa that refused to allow Massoud Rajavi and MEK members to run in the 1980 Iranian presidential election, and the MEK was also unable to win a single seat in the 1980 Iranian legislative election. Instead, Rajavi allied with Iran's new president, Abolhassan Banisadr, elected in January 1980, and the group began clashing with the ruling Islamic Republican Party while avoiding direct and open criticism of Khomeini. The MEK was in turn suppressed by Khomeini's revolutionary organizations and harassed by the Hezbollahi, who in February 1980 began concentrated attacks on meeting places, bookstores, and kiosks of the Mojahedin.

While Khomeini and the MEK had allied against the Shah, Khomeini "disliked the MEK's philosophy, which combined Marxist theories of social evolution and class struggle with a view of Shiite Islam that suggested Shiite clerics had misinterpreted Islam and had been collaborators with the ruling class", and by mid-1980, clerics close to Khomeini were openly referring to the MEK as "monafeghin", "kafer", and "elteqatigari". The MEK in turn accused Khomeini and the clerics of "monopolizing power", "hijacking the revolution", "trampling over democratic rights", and "plotting to set up a fascistic one-party dictatorship".

In 1980-81, the MEK and other leftist and moderate groups rallied in favor of President Abolhassan Banisadr to resist a total takeover by the Islamic Republic Party. The Islamic Republic answered by "unleashing an unprecedented reign of terror", shooting demonstrators, including children. In less than six months, 2,665 persons, 90 per cent of whom were MEK members, were executed. By early 1981, Iranian authorities had closed down MEK offices, outlawed their newspapers, prohibited their demonstrations, and issued arrest warrants for the MEK leaders, forcing the organization go underground once again.

The Islamic Republic's Chief Prosecutor also banned MEK demonstrations, and in an open letter to Ayatollah Khomeini, the MEK warned that if all peaceful avenues were closed off they would have no choice but to return to "armed struggle". In a letter to President Bani-Sadr, the MEK requested the president as the "highest state authority, to protect the rights of citizens, especially their right to demonstrate peacefully". "We have ignored past provocations, but as good Muslims we have the right to resist and to take up arms if necessary, particularly if the monopolists deprive us of our rights to demonstrate," the MEK stated. According to Ervand Abrahamian, the ban on demonstrations met with protests not only from intellectuals well known in secular circles, but also from veterans of the anti-Shah struggles.

On 20 June 1981, the MEK organized a peaceful demonstration in Tehran. Khomeini's Revolutionary Guards suppressed the demonstration, resulting in "50 deaths, 200 injured, and 1000 arrested". The MEK responded by declaring war against the Government of Islamic Republic of Iran, and initiating a series of bombings and assassinations targeting the clerical leadership.

Many MEK sympathizers and middle-level organizers were detained and executed after June 1981. Others were sent to rehabilitation camps, while about eight to ten thousand were kept in prison for minor charges such as "possession of copies of clandestine the Mujahid newspaper and similar acts of defiance". In 1982 the MEK group in Paris claimed that Khomeini's "re-education campaign" involved ordering repenting MEK members to "join the firing squads in charge of executing their former comrades in arms". That same year, the Pasdaran assassinated MEK's field commander, his wife, Massoud Rajavi's wife, and six others. Between June 1981 and April 1982, approximately 3500 MEK members were killed.

According to Professor Cheryl Bernard, the mass execution of political prisoners carried out by the Islamic Republic in 1981 caused the MEK to split into four groups: those that were arrested, imprisoned or executed, a group that went underground in Iran, another that left to Kurdistan and a final group that left to other countries abroad. By the end of 1981, the principal refuge for many exiled members of the MEK had become France. From 1982 to 1988, the lingering underground presence of the MEK in Iran nevertheless remained operational went on to perform an average of sixty operations per week, resulting in assassinations of important Khomeini deputies.

Conflict with the Islamic Republic government (1981–1988) 

On 22 June 1981, IRGC and Hezbollahis responded to anti-regime demonstrations against the dismissal of President Abolhassan Banisadr, to what came to be known as "reign of terror" in Iran. The Warden of Evin prison announced the firing squad executions of demonstrators, including teenage girls. According to Sandra Mackey, the MEK responded by targeting key Iranian official figures for assassination: they bombed the Prime Minister's office, attacked low-ranking civil servants and members of the Revolutionary Guards, along with ordinary citizens who supported the new government. The MEK was the first group carrying out suicide attacks in Iran.

According to Ervand Abrahamian, the MEK attacked the regime for "disrupting rallies and meetings, banning newspapers and burning down bookstores, rigging elections and closing down Universities; kidnapping imprisoning, and torturing political activists; reviving SAVAK and using the tribunals to terrorize their opponents, and engineering the American hostage crises to impose on the nation the ‘medieval’ concept of the velayat-e faqih".

Although the MEK had fought against Iraq in September 1980, it called for peace and signed a peace agreement with Iraq in 1983, "calling the continuation of the war as illegitimate". According to Alireza Jafarzadeh, the MEK had managed to halt Iraqi air raids on Iran on various occasions.

In 1981, the MEK formed the National Council of Resistance of Iran (NCRI) with the stated goal of uniting the opposition to the Iranian government under one umbrella organization. The MEK says that in the past 25 years, the NCRI has evolved into a 540-member parliament-in-exile, with a specific platform that emphasizes free elections, gender equality and equal rights for ethnic and religious minorities. The MEK claims that it also advocates a free-market economy and supports peace in the Middle East. In 2002 the FBI reported that the NCRI has always been "an integral part" of the MEK and is its "political branch". MEK is today the main organization of the NCRI, although the NCRI previously hosted other organizations, such as the Kurdistan Democratic Party of Iran.

The foundation of the National Council of Resistance of Iran (NCRI) and the MEK's participation in it allowed Rajavi to assume the position of chairman of the resistance to the Islamic Republic. Because other opposition groups were banned from legal political process and forced underground, the MEK's coalition build among these movements allowed for the construction of a legitimate opposition to the Islamic Republic.

The organization gained a new life in exile, founding the National Council of Resistance of Iran and continuing to conduct violent attacks in Iran. According to Ronen Cohen, the MEK's "presence in Iraq was proof for Iraq that the MEK's diplomatic wing, the National Council of Resistance of Iran (NCRI), as an authentic representative of the Iranian community diaspora, which opposed the present religious government in Iran and that it had nothing to do with Iraqs's unilateral hostility." According to Patrick Cockburn "Israeli commentators have confirmed the MEK-Israeli connection", although the MEK have denied any association with Israel.

The MEK came to be considered Iran's "largest and most active Iranian exile organization", and its publications were commonly circulated within the Iranian diaspora.

The MEK claims that over 100,000 of its members have been killed and 150,000 imprisoned by the regime, but there is no way to independently confirm these figures. Ambassador Lincoln Bloomfield writes that during this period there was growing resistance across Iran that concluded with vast pro-democracy demonstrations led by MEK leader Massoud Rajavi. Khomeini's government had been "secured at gunpoint with brute force", driving Iran's "first and only freely elected president" Albolhassan Bani-Sadr into exile in what Ervand Abrahamian described as a "reign of terror" and Marvin Zonis called "a campaign of mass slaughter".

In 1981, Massoud Rajavi issued a statement shortly after it went into exile. This statement, according to James Piazza, identified the MEK not as a rival for power but rather a vanguard of popular struggle:

In 1982, the Islamic Republic cracked down MEK operations within Iran. This pre-emptive measure on the part of the regime provoked the MEK into escalating its paramilitary programs as a form of opposition.

In January 1983, then Deputy Prime Minister of Iraq Tariq Aziz and Massoud Rajavi signed a peace communique that co-outlined a peace plan "based on an agreement of mutual recognition of borders as defined by the 1975 Algiers Agreement". According to James Piazza, this peace initiative became the NCRI's first diplomatic act as a "true government in exile". During the meeting, Rajavi claimed that the Iranian leader, Ayatollah Ruhollah Khomeini, had been "the only person calling for the continuation of the [Iran-Iraq] war".

Eventually, the majority of the MEK leadership and members fled to France, where it operated until 1985. In June 1986, France, then seeking to improve relations with Iran, expelled the MEK and the organization relocated to Iraq. MEK representatives contend that their organization had little alternative to moving to Iraq considering its aim of toppling the Iranian clerical government.

Operations Shining sun, Forty Stars, and Mersad 

In 1986, after French Prime Minister Jacques Chirac struck a deal with Tehran for the release of French hostages held prisoners by the Hezbollah in Lebanon, the MEK was forced to leave France and relocated to Iraq. Investigative journalist Dominique Lorentz has related the 1986 capture of French hostages to an alleged blackmail of France by Tehran concerning the nuclear program.

According to James Piazza, Khomeini intended the MEK to be exiled to an obscure location that would weaken their position. However, Iraq hastened to court the MEK "prior to its ousting". The MEK moved its base to Mehran. The Islamic Republic of Iran took an "extensive aerial bombing campaign to push the MEK from their position," and the MEK retaliated with a bombing spree.

The Islamic Republic launched two military operations against the MEK in 1986-1987 named "Nasr" (one and two). This attack on the MEK "failed to eradicate the guerrilla bases along the Iran-Iraq Kurdish borders".

On 27 March 1988, the NLA launched its first military offensive against the Islamic Republic's armed forces. The NLA captured 600 square-kilometres of Islamic Republic territory and 508 soldiers from the Iranian 77th infantry division in Khuzestan Province. The operation was named "Shining Sun" (or "Operation Bright Sun"). "2,000 Islamic Republic soldiers were killed and $100 million worth of regime weaponry and equipment was captured and displayed for foreign journalists," Massoud Rajavi added.

On the night of Saturday 18 June 1988, Iraq launched the Operation Forty Stars with the help of the MEK. With 530 aircraft sorties and heavy use of nerve gas, they attacked to the Iranian forces in the area around Mehran, killing or wounding 3,500 and nearly destroying a Revolutionary Guard division. The forces captured the city and took positions in the heights near Mehran, coming close to wiping the whole Iranian Pasdaran division and taking most of its equipment.

Near the end of the Iran–Iraq War, a military force of 7,000 members of the MEK, armed and equipped by Saddam's Iraq and calling itself the National Liberation Army of Iran (NLA) was founded. On 26 July 1988, six days after Ayatollah Khomeini had announced his acceptance of the UN-brokered ceasefire resolution, the NLA advanced under heavy Iraqi air cover, crossing the Iranian border from Iraq. Massoud Rajavi hoped to mobilize Iranian opposition and overthrow the Islamic Republic. It seized and razed to the ground the Iranian town of Islamabad-e Gharb. As it advanced further into Iran, Iraq ceased its air support and Iranian forces cut off NLA supply lines and counterattacked under cover of fighter planes and helicopter gunships. On 29 July the NLA announced a voluntary withdrawal back to Iraq. The MEK claims it lost 1,400 dead or missing and the Islamic Republic sustained 55,000 casualties (either IRGC, Basij forces, or the army). The Islamic Republic claims to have killed 4,500 NLA during the operation. The operation was called Foroughe Javidan (Eternal Light) by the MEK and the counterattack Operation Mersad by the Iranian forces. The MEK contended that it had no choice to its presence in Iraq if it was to have any chance at toppling the Iranian regime. Rajavi stated that "the failure of Eternal Light was not a military blunder, but was instead rooted in the members’ thoughts for their spouses".

1988 execution of MEK prisoners 

On 19 July 1988, Iranian authorities suddenly isolated major prisons, having its courts of law go on an unscheduled holiday to avoid relatives finding out about those imprisoned. According to Ervand Abrahamian, "thus began an act of violence unprecedented in Iranian history." Prisoners were initially told that this was not a trial but a process for initiating a general amnesty and separating the Muslims from the non-Muslims. Prisoners were asked if they were willing to denounce the MEK before cameras, help the IRI hunt down MEK members, name secret sympathizers, identify phoney repenters, or go to the war front and walk through enemy mindfields. According to Abrahamian, the questions were designed to "tax to the utmost the victim's sense of decency, honor, and self-respect". The Mojahedin who gave unsatisfactory answers were promptly taken to a special room and later hanged in batches of six.

According to the US State Department, the "death commissions" responsible for the 1988 executions of Iranian political prisoners started on 19 July (1988) and included the current head of the Iranian judiciary and current Minister of Justice. Following Operation Mersad, a military attack on Iranian forces by the MEK desiring to gather Iranian opposition at home and overthrow the Islamic Republic, a large number of prisoners from the MEK were executed along with many other individuals from other leftist opposition groups Khomeini used the MEK's failed invasion as a pretext for the mass execution of thousands of MEK members "who remained steadfast in their support for the MEK" and other leftists in Iranian jails through a fatwa. The executions were carried out by several high-ranking members of Iran's current government. According to Amnesty International, "thousands of political dissidents were systematically subjected to enforced disappearance in Iranian detention facilities across the country and extrajudicially executed pursuant to an order issued by the Supreme Leader of Iran and implemented across prisons in the country. Many of those killed during this time were subjected to torture and other cruel, inhuman and degrading treatment or punishment in the process."

Most of the prisoners executed were serving prison terms on account of peaceful activities (distributing opposition newspapers and leaflets, taking part in demonstrations, or collecting donations for political oppositions) or holding outlawed political views. In order to eliminate potential political oppositions, the Islamic Republic started "coordinated extrajudicial killings" in Iran. Under International law, the killings were considered a "crime against humanity". The commissions including judicial, prosecution, intelligence and prison officials proceeded executions that were not approved by their own existing legislation, and sentenced prisoners to death despite any proven "internationally recognized criminal offence". The Prisoners were questioned if they were willing to give written repentance for their political activities and beliefs. Those executed included women and children.

Ayatollah Montazeri wrote to Ayatollah Khomeini saying "at least order to spare women who have children ... the execution of several thousand prisoners in a few days will not reflect positively and will not be mistake-free ... A large number of prisoners have been killed under torture by interrogators ... in some prisons of the Islamic Republic young girls are being raped ... As a result of unruly torture, many prisoners have become deaf or paralysed or afflicted with chronic decease."

In 2016, an audio recording was posted online of a high-level official meeting that took place in August 1988 between Hossein Ali Montazeri and the officials responsible for the mass killings in Tehran. In the recording, Hossein Ali Montazeri is heard saying that the ministry of intelligence used the MEK's armed incursion as a pretext to carry out the mass killings, which "had been under consideration for several years". Iranian authorities have dismissed the incident as "nothing but propaganda", presenting the executions as a lawful response to a small group of incarcerated individuals who had colluded with the MEK to support its 25 July 1988 incursion. Those executed were put in collective graves containing multiple corpses at the Khavaran cemetery, which the Iranian government tried to cover up by changing the cemetery into a park.

Human rights organizations say that the number of those executed remains a point of contention. Prisoners were charged with "moharebeh" or "waging war on God" and those who said to be affiliated with the MEK, including children as young as 13 years old, were hanged from cranes by Ayatollah Khomeini's direct orders. The Iranian government accused those investigating the executions of "disclosing state secrets" and threatening national security". According to Amnesty International, "there has also been an ongoing campaign by the Islamic Republic to demonize victims, distort facts, and repress family survivors and human rights defenders. In 2019, Maryam Rajavi, released a book named "Crime Against Humanity". The book is about the 1988 massacres of political prisoners in Iran, listing the location of 36 Iranian mass graves and explaining that about 30,000 people were executed, with the majority being MEK members.

Post-war Saddam era (1988–2003) 

In 1990, Kazem Rajavi (brother of Massoud Rajavi and a human rights activist), was notably assassinated in Geneva. The Swiss government named thirteen Iranian officials, with special mission stamped into their passports as participants in the assassination. According to Kenneth Katzman, the MEK is "a major target of Iran's international security apparatus and its campaign in assassinating opponents abroad".

In April 1992, the MEK attacked 10 Iranian embassies including the Iranian Mission to the United Nations in New York using different weapons, taking hostages, and injuring Iranian ambassadors and embassy employees. There were dozens of arrests. The Iranian Ministry of Intelligence (MOIS) cracked down on MEK activity, carrying out what a US Federal Research Division, Library of Congress Report referred to as "psychological warfare".

The MEK claims to play a major role in anti-regime demonstrations. According to Kenneth Katzman, many analysts believe that the MEK lacks sufficient strength or support to seriously challenge the Iranian government's grip on power. However, MEK followers in Iran "have been resilient and persistent, defying the regime's efforts to eliminate the organization within Iran". The Iranian regime is concerned about MEK activities in Iran, and MEK supporters are a major target of Iran's internal security apparatus and its campaign of assassinating opponents abroad. The Iranian government is believed to be responsible for killing MEK members, Kazem Rajavi on 24 April 1990 and Mohammad-Hossein Naghdi, a NCRI representative on 6 March 1993.

"In a sign of the group's appreciation for Saddam's generous hospitality and largesse", MEK assisted the Iraqi Republican Guard in suppressing the 1991 nationwide uprisings of Shias, Kurds and Turkmens against Baathist regime.

FIFA president Sepp Blatter said in June 1998 that he received "anonymous threats of disruption from Iranian exiles" for the 1998 FIFA World Cup match between Iran and the U.S. football teams at Stade de Gerland. The MEK bought some 7,000 out of 42,000 tickets for the match between, in order to promote themselves with the political banners they smuggled. When the initial plan foiled with TV cameras of FIFA avoiding filming them, intelligence sources had been tipped off about a pitch invasion. To prevent an interruption in the match, extra security entered Stade Gerland.

In 1999, after a 2 1⁄2-year investigation, Federal authorities arrested 29 individuals in Operation Eastern Approach, of whom 15 were held on charges of helping MEK members illegally enter the United States. The ringleader was pleaded guilty to providing phony documents to MEK members and violation of Antiterrorism and Effective Death Penalty Act of 1996.

According to Ilan Berman, in 2002 the NCRI publicly called or the formation of a National Solidarity Front against the Iranian regime saying that it is "prepared for cooperation with other political forces" that seek a republican form of government and are committed to rejecting Iran's current theocracy.

In 2002 the MEK revealed the existence of Iran's nuclear program. They have since made various claims about the programme, not all of which have been accurate. For example, in 2015, MEK falsely claimed to have found a secret nuclear facility they called "Lavizan-3".

2003 French arrests 
In June 2003, French police raided the MEK's properties, including its base in Auvers-sur-Oise, under the orders of anti-terrorist magistrate Jean-Louis Bruguière, after suspicions that it was trying to shift its base of operations there. 160 suspected MEK members were then arrested, including Maryam Rajavi and her brother Saleh Rajavi. After questioning, most of those detained were released, but 24 members, including Maryam Rajavi, were kept in detention.

In response, 40 supporters began hunger strikes to protest the arrests, and 10 members including Neda Hassani, immolated themselves in various European capitals by lighting themselves on fire in front of French embassies, following orders from MEK. French Interior Minister Nicolas Sarkozy declared that the MEK "recently wanted to make France its support base, notably after the intervention in Iraq", while Pierre de Bousquet de Florian, head of France's domestic intelligence service, claimed that the group was "transforming its Val d'Oise centre [near Paris] [...] into an international terrorist base". Police found $1.3 million in $100 bills in cash in their offices.

U.S. Senator Sam Brownback, a Republican from Kansas and chairman of the Foreign Relations subcommittee on South Asia, then accused the French of doing "the Iranian government's dirty work". Along with other members of Congress, he wrote a letter of protest to President Jacques Chirac, while longtime MEK supporters such as Sheila Jackson Lee, a Democrat from Texas, criticized Maryam Radjavi's arrest.

A court later found that there were no grounds for terrorism or terrorism-related finance charges. In 2014, prosecuting judges also dropped all charges of money laundering and fraud.

Post-U.S. invasion of Iraq (2003–2016) 

During the Iraq War, the Coalition forces bombed MEK bases and forced them to surrender in May 2003. U.S. troops later posted guards at its bases. The U.S. military also protected and gave logistical support to the MEK as U.S. officials viewed the group as a high value source of intelligence on Iran.

After the 2003 invasion of Iraq, MEK camps were bombed by the U.S., resulting in at least 50 deaths. It was later revealed that the U.S. bombings were part of an agreement between the Iranian government and Washington. In the agreement Tehran offered to oust some al-Qaeda suspects if the U.S. came down on the MEK.
In the operation, the U.S. reportedly captured 6,000 MEK soldiers and over 2,000 pieces of military equipment, including 19 British-made Chieftain tanks. The MEK compound outside Fallujah became known as Camp Fallujah, adjacent to FOB Dreamland.

At Camp Ashraf, the US forces disarmed the residents and signed a formal ceasefire agreement that promised them the status of "protected persons" under the Fourth Geneva Convention, which "outlines the rules for protecting civilians in times of war". They were then placed under the guard of the U.S. Military. Defectors from the MEK requested assistance from the Coalition forces, who created a "temporary internment and protection facility" for them. In the first year these numbered "several hundred", mainly Iranian soldiers captured in the Iran-Iraq war and other Iranians lured to the MEK. In all, during the period of US control, nearly 600 members of the MEK defected.

The group's core members were for many years effectively confined to Camp Ashraf, before later being relocated to a former U.S. military base, Camp Liberty, in Iraq, and eventually to Albania.

Separate to events in Iraq, the organization launched a free-to-air satellite television network named Vision of Freedom (Sima-ye-Azadi) in England in 2003. It previously operated Vision of Resistance analogue television in Iraq in the 1990s, accessible in western provinces of Iran. They also had a radio station, Radio Iran Zamin, that was closed down in June 1998.

In 2006, an EU freeze on the group's funds was overturned by the European Court of First Instance.

In 2010, political prisoner Ali Saremi was executed by the Iranian regime for co-operating with the MEK. Saremi's torture and execution was covered in the press and brought international attention to the Human rights situation in Iran. In 2011, Mohammad Ali Haj Aghaei and Jafar Kazemi were also executed by the Iranian government for co-operating with the MEK, despite Hillary Clinton urging Iranian authorities to release the two activists.

Iraqi government's crackdown (2009–2010) 

On 23 January 2009, while on a visit to Tehran, Iraqi National Security Advisor Mowaffak al-Rubaie reiterated the Iraqi Prime Minister's earlier announcement that the MEK organization would no longer be able to base itself on Iraqi soil and stated that the members of the organization would have to make a choice, either to go back to Iran or to go to a third country, adding that these measures would be implemented over the next two months.

In 2009 American troops gave the Iraqi government responsibility of the MEK. Iraqi authorities, which were sympathetic to Iran, allowed Iran-linked militias to attack the MEK. On 29 July 2009, eleven Iranians were killed and over 500 were injured in a raid by Iraqi security on the MEK Camp Ashraf in Diyala province of Iraq. U.S. officials had long opposed a violent takeover of the camp northeast of Baghdad, and the raid is thought to symbolize the declining American influence in Iraq. After the raid, the U.S. Secretary of State, Hillary Rodham Clinton, stated the issue was "completely within [the Iraqi government's] purview". In the course of attack, 36 Iranian dissidents were arrested and removed from the camp to a prison in a town named Khalis, where the arrestees went on hunger strike for 72 days. Finally, the dissidents were released when they were in an extremely critical condition and on the verge of death.

In 2010, Iranian authorities charged five MEK protesters of "rioting and arson" under the crime of moharebeh, an offence reserved for those who "take up arms against the state" and carries the death penalty.

In July 2010, the Supreme Iraqi Criminal Tribunal issued an arrest warrant for 39 MEK members, including Massoud and Maryam Rajavi, accusing them of crimes against humanity during the 1991 uprisings in Iraq. The MEK denied the charges.

Iran's nuclear programme 

The MEK and the NCRI revealed the existence of Iran's nuclear program in a press conference held on 14 August 2002 in Washington DC. MEK representative Alireza Jafarzadeh stated that Iran is running two top-secret projects, one in the city of Natanz and another in a facility located in Arak, which was later confirmed by the International Atomic Energy Agency.

Journalists Seymour Hersh and Connie Bruck have written that the information was given to the MEK by Israel. Among others, it was described by a senior IAEA official and a monarchist advisor to Reza Pahlavi, who said before MEK they were offered to reveal the information, but they refused because it would be seen negatively by the people of Iran. Similar accounts could be found elsewhere by others, including comments made by US officials.

On 18 November 2004, MEK representative Mohammad Mohaddessin used satellite images to state that a new facility existed in northeast Tehran named "Center for the Development of Advanced Defence Technology". This allegation by MEK and all their subsequent allegations were false.

In 2010 the NCRI claimed to have uncovered a secret nuclear facility in Iran. These claims were dismissed by U.S. officials, who did not believe the facilities to be nuclear. In 2013, the NCRI again claimed to have discovered a secret underground nuclear site.

In 2012, NBC News' Richard Engel and Robert Windrem published a report quoting U.S. officials, who spoke to NBC News on condition of anonymity, that the MEK was being "financed, trained, and armed by Israel's secret service" to assassinate Iranian nuclear scientists. A Senior State Department Official said that they never said that the MEK was involved in the assassinations of Iranian nuclear scientists. Former CIA case officer in the Middle East, Robert Baer said that the perpetrators "could only be Israel", and that "it is quite likely Israel is acting in tandem with" the MEK.

Relocation from Iraq 
On 1 January 2009, the U.S. military transferred control of Camp Ashraf to the Iraqi government. On the same day, Prime Minister Nuri al-Maliki announced that the militant group would not be allowed to base its operations from Iraqi soil.

In 2012, the MEK moved from Camp Ashraf to Camp Hurriya in Baghdad (a onetime U.S. base formerly known as Camp Liberty). A rocket and mortar attack killed 5 and injured 50 others at Camp Hurriya on 9 February 2013. MEK residents of the facility and their representatives appealed to the UN Secretary-General and U.S. officials to let them return to Ashraf, which they said has concrete buildings and shelters that offer more protection. The United States has been working with the UN High Commissioner for Refugees on the resettlement project.

Settlement in Albania (2016–present) 
In 2013, the United States requested that the MEK relocate to Albania, but the organization initially rejected the offer. The MEK eventually accepted to move about 3,000 members to Albania, and the U.S. donated $20 million to the U.N. refugee agency to help them resettle. On 9 September 2016, more than 280 remaining MEK members were relocated to Albania. The installation is located in Manëz, Durrës County, where they have been protested by the locals.

Relationship during Trump presidency
In 2017, the year before John Bolton became President Trump's National Security Adviser, Bolton addressed members of the MEK and said that they would celebrate in Tehran before 2019. By 2018, over 4,000 MEK members had entered Albania, according to the INSTAT data.

By 2018, operatives of the MEK were believed to be still conducting covert operations inside Iran to overthrow Iran's government. Seymour Hersh reported that "some American-supported covert operations continue in Iran today," with the MEK's prime goal of removing the current Iranian government.

On 30 June 2018, Rudy Giuliani, Donald Trump's personal lawyer, lectured an MEK gathering in Paris, calling for regime change in Tehran. John McCain and John Bolton and he have met the MEK's leader Maryam Rajavi or spoken at its rallies.

During the Free Iran 2019 conference in Albania, Rudy Giuliani attended an MEK podium, where the former New York City mayor described the group as a "government-in-exile", saying it is a ready-to-go alternative to lead the country if the Iranian government falls. Additionally, the Trump administration said it would not rule out the MEK as a viable replacement for the current Iranian regime.

Islamic Republic of Iran operations against MEK inside Europe 

On 30 June 2018 Belgian police arrested married couple of Iranian heritage Amir Saadouni and Nasimeh Naami on charges of "attempted terrorist murder and preparing a terrorist act" against an MEK rally in France. The couple had in their possession half of a kilogram of TATP explosives and a detonator. Police also detained Asadollah Assadi, an Iranian diplomat in Vienna. German prosecutors charged Assadi with "activity as foreign agent and conspiracy to commit murder by contacting the couple and giving them a device containing 500 grams of TATP". Prosecutors said Assadi was a member of the Iranian Ministry of Intelligence and Security service, an organization that focuses on "combating of opposition groups inside and outside of Iran". Iran responded that the arrests were a "false flag ploy", with the Iranian Foreign Ministry spokesman saying the "two suspects in Belgium were in fact members of the People's Mujahideen". In October 2018, the French government officially and publicly blamed Iran's Intelligence Service for the failed attack against the MEK. U.S. officials also condemned Iran over the foiled bomb plot that France blames on Tehran. In December 2018, Albania expelled two Iranian diplomats due to alleged involvement in the bomb plot against the MEK (where Mayor Giuliani and other US government officials were also gathered) accusing the two of "violating their diplomatic status".
Iranian President Hassan Rouhani said that the MEK incited violence during the 2017–2018 Iranian protests.

In October 2019, Albanian police discovered an Iranian paramilitary network that allegedly planned attacks against MEK members in Albania. Albania's police chief, Ardi Veliu, said that the Iran Revolutionary Guard's foreign wing operated an "active terrorist cell" that targeted members of the MEK. A police statement said that two Iranian security officials led the network from Tehran, and that it was allegedly linked to organised crime groups in Turkey. It also said that the network used a former MEK member to collect information in Albania. Valiu also said that a planned attack on the MEK by Iranian government agents was foiled in March.

In 2020, newspaper De Standaard said evidence that Iranian intelligence and security was involved in the failed 2018 bomb plot against an MEK rally was mounting. In a note to the federal prosecutor's office, the State Security writes that "the attack was devised in the name and under the impetus of Iran", with the note also describing one of the case's suspects, Assadolah Assadi, as a MOIS agent.  Amir Saadouni and Nasimeh Naami, who in 2018 were found with half a kilo of explosives and are also being charged in the case, admitted that they had been in contact with Assadolah Assadi. In October 2020, the Iranian diplomat Assadolah Assadi charged in Belgium with planning to bomb a rally by the MEK "warned authorities of possible retaliation by unidentified groups if he is found guilty". Assadi would become the first Iranian diplomat to go on trial on charges of terrorism within the European Union. In February 2021, Assadi and his accomplices were found guilty of attempted terroris and Assadi was sentenced to 20 years in prison.

In September 2022, Albania suffered a second cyber-attack, resulting in it cutting diplomatic ties with the Islamic Republic and ordering Iranian embassy staff to leave. According to sources, evidence indicates that the MEK was one of the reasons behind the cyber-attack against the Albanian government.

Ideology

Before the revolution 
According to Katzman, the MEK's early ideology is a matter of dispute. While scholars generally describe the MEK's ideology as an attempt to combine "Islam with revolutionary Marxism", today the organization claims that it has always emphasized Islam, and that Marxism and Islam are incompatible. Katzman writes that their ideology "espoused the creation of a classless society that would combat world imperialism, international Zionism, colonialism, exploitation, racism, and multinational corporations". The MEK's ideological foundation was developed during the period of the Iran revolution. According to its official history, the MEK first defined itself as a group that wanted to establish a nationalist, democratic, revolutionary Muslim organization in favour of change in Iran.

Historian Ervand Abrahamian observed that the MEK were "consciously influenced by Marxism, both modern and classical", but they always denied being Marxists because they were aware that the term was colloquial to 'atheistic materialism' among Iran's general public. The Iranian regime for the same reason was "eager to pin on the Mojahedin the labels of Islamic-Marxists and Marxist-Muslims".

According to Abrahamian, it was the first Iranian organization to develop systematically a modern revolutionary interpretation of Islam that "differed sharply from both the old conservative Islam of the traditional clergy and the new populist version formulated in the 1970s by Ayatollah Khomeini and his disciples". Abrahamian said that the MEK's early ideology constituted a "combination of Muslim themes; Shii notions of martyrdom; classical Marxist theories of class struggle and historical determinism; and neo-Marxist concepts of armed struggle, guerilla warfare and revolutionary heroism". However, the MEK claim that this misrepresents their ideology in that Marxism and Islam are incompatible, and that the MEK has always emphasized Islam. According to James Piazza, the MEK worked towards the creation by armed popular struggle of a society in which ethnic, gender, or class discrimination would be obliterated.

Nasser Sadegh told military tribunals that although the MEK respected Marxism as a "progressive method of social analysis, they could not accept materialism, which was contrary to their Islamic ideology". The MEK eventually had a falling out with Marxist groups. According to Sepehr Zabir, "they soon became Enemy No. 1 of both pro-Soviet Marxist groups, the Tudeh and the Majority Fedayeen".

The MEK's ideology of revolutionary Shiaism is based on an interpretation of Islam so similar to that of Ali Shariati that "many concluded" they were inspired by him. According to Ervand Abrahamian, it is clear that "in later years" that Shariati and "his prolific works" had "indirectly helped the Mujahedin".

In the group's "first major ideological work", Nahzat-i Husseini or Hussein's Movement, authored by one of the group's founders, Ahmad Reza'i, it was argued that Nezam-i Towhid (monotheistic order) sought by the prophet Muhammad, was a commonwealth fully united not only in its worship of one God but in a classless society that strives for the common good. "Shiism, particularly Hussein's historic act of martyrdom and resistance, has both a revolutionary message and a special place in our popular culture".

As described by Abrahamian, one Mojahedin ideologist argued

Reza'i further argued that the banner of revolt raised by the Shi'i Imams, especially Ali, Hassan, and Hussein, was aimed against feudal landlords and exploiting merchant capitalists as well as against usurping Caliphs who betrayed the Nezam-i-Towhid. For Reza'i and the Mujahidin it was the duty of all Muslims to continue this struggle to create a 'classless society' and destroy all forms of capitalism, despotism, and imperialism. The Mojahedin summed up their attitude towards religion in these words: 'After years of extensive study into Islamic history and Shi'i ideology, our organization has reached the firm conclusion that Islam, especially Shi'ism, will play a major role in inspiring the masses to join the revolution. It will do so because Shi'ism, particularly Hussein's historic act of resistance, has both a revolutionary message and a special place in our popular culture.

After the revolution 

Massoud Rajavi supported the idea that the Shiite religion as compatible with pluralistic democracy. In 1981, after signing the "covenant of freedom and independence" with Banisadr, and establishing NCRI Massoud Rajavi made an announcement to the foreign press about the MEK's ideology saying that "First we want freedom for all political parties. We reject both political prisoners and political executions. In the true spirit of Islam, we advocate freedom, fraternity, and an end to all repression, censorship, and injustices." They appealed to all opposition groups to join NCRI, but failed to attract any except for the Kurdish Democratic Party. The failure is mainly associated to MEK's religious ideology. The covenant also proposed the protection of Iranian minorities, "specially the Kurdish minority".

According to Kenneth Katzman, the MEK has "tried to show itself as worthy of U.S. support on the basis of its commitment to values compatible with those of the United States – democracy, free market economics, protection of the rights of women and minorities, and peaceful relations with Iran's neighbors". According to Department of State's October 1994 report, the MEK used violence in its campaign to overthrow the Iranian regime.

In 1995, the MEK's website published a 16-point 'Charter for Fundamental Freedoms for Future Iran' that it said was announced by Maryam Rajavi at a meeting in Germany.

In 2001, Kenneth Katzman wrote that the organization publicly espouses principles that include "democracy, human rights protections, free market economics, and Middle East peace", but some analysts dispute that they are genuinely committed to what they state. A 2009 U.S. Department of State report stated that their ideology was a blend of Marxism, Islamism and feminism.

The MEK says it is seeking regime change in Iran through peaceful means with an aim to replace the clerical rule in Iran with a secular government. It also claims to have disassociated itself from its former revolutionary ideology in favor of liberal democratic values, but they fail to "present any track record to substantiate a capability or intention to be democratic". The MEK is also said to have a "commitment to a policy of peaceful coexistence and a non-nuclear Iran".
 
The MEK says it supports a "secular democratic system", where their leader, Maryam Rajavi, calls for a "pluralist system", non-nuclear Iran, human rights and freedom of expression, separation of government and religion, and end to Sharia law.

View on the Israeli–Palestinian conflict 

Initially, the MEK used to criticize the Pahlavi dynasty for allying with Israel and apartheid South Africa, calling them racist states and demanding cancellation of all political and economic agreements with them. The MEK opposed Israeli–Palestinian peace process and was anti-Zionist.

The MEK's Central Cadre established contact with the Palestinian Liberation Organization (PLO), by sending emissaries to Paris, Dubai, and Qatar to meet PLO officials. On 3 August 1972, they bombed the Jordanian embassy as a means to avenge King Hussein's unleashing his troops on the PLO in 1970.

View on the United States 

In the late 1970s, the intelligentsia as a class in Iran was distinctly nationalistic and anti-imperialistic. The MEK had impeccable nationalistic credentials, calling for the nationalization of foreign companies and economic independence from the capitalist world, and praising writers such as Al-e Ahmad, Saedi and Shariati for being "anti-imperialist". Rajavi in his presidential campaign after revolution used to warn against what he called the "imperialist danger". The matter was so fundamental to MEK that it criticized the Iranian government on that basis, accusing the Islamic Republic of "capitulation to imperialism" and being disloyal to democracy that according to Rajavi was the only means to "safeguard from American imperialism".

After exile, the MEK sought the support of prominent politicians, academics and human rights lawyers. Rajavi tried to reach as broad a Western public as possible by giving frequent interviews to Western newspapers. In these interviews, Rajavi toned down the issues of imperialism, foreign policy, and social revolution. Instead, he stressed the themes of democracy, political liberties, political pluralism, human rights, respect for 'personal property', the plight of political prisoners, and the need to end the senseless war.

In January 1993, President-elect Clinton wrote a private letter to the Massoud Rajavi, in which he set out his support for the organization. The organization has also received support United States officials including Tom Ridge, Howard Dean, Michael Mukasey, Louis Freeh, Hugh Shelton, Rudy Giuliani, John Bolton, Bill Richardson, James L. Jones, and Edward G. Rendell.

As Mukasey mentioned in The New York Times, in 2011 he had received $15,000 to $20,000 to present a lecture about "MEK-related events", as well as what he listed as "a foreign agent lobbying pro bono for MEK's political arm".

Some politicians have declared receiving payment for supporting the MEK, but others support the group without payment.

Ideological revolution and women's rights 

During the transitional period, the MEK projected an image of a "forward looking, radical and progressive Islamic force". Throughout the revolution, the MEK played a major role in developing the "revolutionary Muslim woman", which was portrayed as "the living example of the new ideal of womanhood". The MEK is "known for its female-led military units". According to Ervand Abrahamian, the MEK "declared that God had created men and women to be equal in all things: in political and intellectual matters, as well as in legal, economic, and social issues". According to Tohidi, in 1982, as the government in Tehran led an expansive effort to limit women's rights, the MEK adopted a female leadership. In 1987, the National Liberation Army (NLA), "saw female resistors commanding military operations from their former base at Camp Ashraf (in Diyala, Iraq) to Iran's westernmost provinces, where they engaged alongside the men in armed combat with Iran's regular and paramilitary forces".

Shortly after the revolution, Rajavi married Ashraf Rabii, an MEK member regarded as "the symbol of revolutionary womanhood". Rabii was killed by Iranian forces in 1982. On 27 January 1985, Massoud Rajavi appointed Maryam Azodanlu as his co-equal leader. The announcement, stated that this would give women equal say within the organization and thereby "would launch a great ideological revolution within Mojahedin, the Iranian public and the whole Muslim World."

Five weeks later, the MEK announced that its Politburo and Central Committee had asked Rajavi and Azondalu, who was already married, to marry one another to deepen and pave the way for the "ideological revolution. At the time Maryam Azodanlu was known as only the younger sister of a veteran member, and the wife of Mehdi Abrishamchi. According to the announcement, Maryam Azodanlu and Mehdi Abrishamchi had recently divorced in order to facilitate this 'great revolution'. According to Ervand Abrahamian "in the eyes of traditionalists, particularly among the bazaar middle class, the whole incident was indecent. It smacked of wife-swapping, especially when Abrishamchi announced his own marriage to Khiabani's younger sister. It involved women with young children and wives of close friends – a taboo in traditional Iranian culture;" something that further isolated the Mojahedin and also upset some members of the organization. Also according to Ervand Abrahamian, "the incident was equally outrageous in the eyes of the secularists, especially among the modern intelligentsia. It projected onto the public arena a matter that should have been treated as a private issue between two individuals." Many criticized Maryam Azodanlu's giving up her own maiden name (something most Iranian women did not do and she herself had not done in her previous marriage). They would question whether this was in line with her claims of being a staunch feminist.

Maryam Rajavi became increasingly important over feminism-colored politics. The emancipation of women is now depicted in Maryam Rajavi's writings "as both a policy end and a strategy toward revolutionizing Iran. Secularism, democracy, and women's rights are thus today's leading themes in the group's strategic communications. As for Maryam Rajavi's leadership, in 2017 it appears to be political and cultural; any remnants of a military force and interest in terrorist strategies have faded away."

Membership 
According to Kenneth Katzman, most analysts agree that MEK members tend to be "more dedicated and zealous" than those of other organizations.

1980s 
According to George E. Delury, the organization was thought to have 5,000 hard-core members and 50,000 supporters in early 1980. In June 1980, at perhaps the height of their popularity, the Mojahedin attracted 150,000 sympathizers to a rally in Tehran. 
According to a RAND Corporation policy report, the MEK initially acquired supporters and members through "its Marxist social policy, coeducational living opportunities, antipathy to U.S. influence, and—unlike traditional Leftist groups—support for a government that reflected Islamic ideals. The members, which primarily consisted of University students and graduates, were encouraged to live together and form close social bonds.
Pierre Razoux estimates MEK's maximum strength from 1981–1983 to 1987–1988, about 15,000 fighters with a few tanks and several dozen light artillery pieces, recoilless guns, machine guns, anti-tank missiles and SAM-7s. Jeffrey S. Dixon and Meredith Reid Sarkees estimate their prewar strength to be about 2,000, later peaking to 10,000.

Post-2000 
The MEK was believed to have a 5,000–7,000-strong armed guerrilla group based in Iraq before the 2003 war, but a membership of between 3,000 and 5,000 is considered more likely. In 2005, the U.S. think-tank the Council on Foreign Relations stated that the MEK had 10,000 members, one-third to one-half of whom were fighters. According to a 2003 article by The New York Times, the MEK was composed of 5,000 fighters based in Iraq, many of them female. Reports by The Military Balance in 2003 and 2004, as well as BMI Research's 2008 report estimate MEK's armed wing strength 6,000–8,000 and its political wing around 3,000, thus a total 9,000–11,000 membership. In April 2003, US forces signed a cease-fire agreement of "mutual understanding and coordination" with the MEK. A 2013 article in Foreign Policy claimed that there were some 2,900 members in Iraq. In 2011, United States Department of Defense estimated global membership of the organization between 5,000 and 13,500 persons scattered throughout Europe, North America, and Iraq. Asharq Al-Awsat reported that the MEK's 2016 gathering attracted "over 100,000 Iranian dissidents" in Paris. In February 2020, the MEK claimed to have 2500 members in its Albania camp; a New York Times reporter visiting the camp estimated 200 people were present over two days.

Terrorist designation

Assignment of designation
The countries and organizations below have officially listed MEK as a terrorist organization:

In 1997, the United States put the MEK on the U.S. State Department list of Foreign Terrorist Organizations. The Clinton administration reported the Los Angeles Times that "The inclusion of the People's Mojahedin was intended as a goodwill gesture to Tehran and its newly elected president, Mohammad Khatami".

In 2004, the United States also considered the group as "noncombatants" and "protected persons" under the Geneva Conventions. In 2002, the European Union, pressured by Washington, added MEK to its terrorist list. In 2008, the U.S. Secretary of State Condoleezza Rice denied the MEK its request to be delisted, and MEK leaders then began a lobbying campaign to be removed from the list by promoting the group as a viable opposition to the clerical regime in Iran.

The MEK had a "strong" base in the U.S. who tried to remove the group from the U.S. State Department list of Foreign Terrorist Organizations and consequently turning it into a legitimate actor. In 2011, several former senior U.S. officials, including Homeland Security Secretary Tom Ridge, three former chairmen of the U.S. Joint Chiefs of Staff, two former directors of the CIA, former commander of NATO Wesley Clark, two former U.S. Ambassadors to the United Nations, the former U.S. Attorney General Michael Mukasey, a former White House Chief of Staff, a former commander of the United States Marine Corps, former U.S. National Security Advisor Frances Townsend, and U.S. President Barack Obama's retired National Security Adviser General James L. Jones called for the MEK to be removed from its official State Department foreign terrorist listing on the grounds that they constituted a viable opposition to the Islamic Republic Government.

Hersh reported names of former U.S. officials paid to speak in support of MEK, including former CIA directors James Woolsey and Porter Goss; New York City Mayor Rudolph Giuliani; former Vermont Governor Howard Dean; former Director of the Federal Bureau of Investigation Louis Freeh and former U.N. Ambassador John Bolton. The National Council of Resistance of Iran rejected these allegations.

According to Lord Alex Carlile, the organization was put on the terrorist list "solely because the mullahs insisted on such action if there was to be any dialogue between Washington and Tehran".

Removal of designation 
The United Kingdom lifted the MEK's designation as a terrorist group in June 2008, followed by the Council of the European Union on 26 January 2009, after what the group called a "seven-year-long legal and political battle". It was also lifted in the United States following a decision by U.S. Secretary of State Hillary Clinton on 21 September 2012 and lastly in Canada on 20 December 2012.

In 2008, the Luxembourg European Court of First Instance upheld that there was no justification for including the MEK in the EU terrorist list and freezing its funds. The Court then allowed an appeal to delist the MEK from the EU's terror list. An attempt by EU governments to maintain the MEK in the terror list was rejected by the European Court of Justice, with ambassadors of the 27 member states agreeing that the MEK should be removed from the EU terrorism list. The MEK was removed from the EU terror list on 26 January 2009, becoming the first organization to have been removed from the EU terror list.

The Council of the European Union removed the group's terrorist designation following the Court of Justice of the European Union's 2008 censure of France for failing to disclose new alleged evidence of the MEK's terrorism threat. Delisting allowed MEK to pursue tens of millions of dollars in frozen assets and lobby in Europe for more funds. It also removed the terrorist label from MEK members at Camp Ashraf in Iraq.

On 28 September 2012, the U.S. State Department formally removed MEK from its official list of terrorist organizations, beating a 1 October deadline in an MEK lawsuit. Secretary of State Clinton said in a statement that the decision was made because the MEK had renounced violence and had cooperated in closing their Iraqi paramilitary base. It was reported that MEK was removed from the U.S. list of terrorist organizations after intensive lobbying by a bipartisan group of lawmakers. An official denied that lobbying by well-known figures influenced the decision. Some former U.S. officials vehemently reject the new status and believe the MEK has not changed its ways.

The MEK advocated to remove itself from the list of Foreign Terrorist Organizations, having paid high-profile officials upwards of $50,000 give speeches calling for delisting. Among them, Rendell who admitted himself being paid to speak in support of the MEK and Hamilton who said he was paid to "appear on a panel Feb. 19 at the Mayflower Hotel in Washington". In February 2015, The Intercept published that Bob Menendez, John McCain, Judy Chu, Dana Rohrabacher and Robert Torricelli received campaign contributions from MEK supporters.

In May 2018, Daniel Benjamin who held office as the Coordinator for Counterterrorism between 2009 and 2012, told The New York Times that the MEK offered him money in exchange for his support.

Ervand Abrahamian, Shaul Bakhash, Juan Cole and Gary Sick among others, published "Joint Experts' Statement on the Mujahedin-e Khalq" on Financial Times voicing their concerns regarding MEK delisting. The National Iranian American Council denounced the decision, stating it "opens the door to Congressional funding of the M.E.K. to conduct terrorist attacks in Iran" and "makes war with Iran far more likely". Iran state television also condemned the delisting of the group, saying that the U.S. considers MEK to be "good terrorists because the U.S. is using them against Iran".

Cult of personality

The MEK has barred children in Camp Ashraf in an attempt to have its members devote themselves to their cause of resistance against the Iranian regime, a rule that has given the MEK reputation of being "cultish"." Various sources have also described the MEK as a "cult", "cult-like", or having a "cult of personality", while other sources say the Iranian regime is running a disinformation campaign to label the MEK a "cult".

According to a RAND Corporation policy report, while in Paris, Massoud Rajavi began to implement an "ideological revolution", which required members an increased study and devotion that later expanded into "near religious devotion to the Rajavis". After its settlement in Iraq, however, it experienced a shortfall of volunteers. This led to the recruitment of members including Iranian dissidents, as well as Iranian economic migrants in countries such as Turkey and the United Arab Emirates, through "false promises of employment, land, aid in applying for asylum in Western countries, and even marriage, to attract them to Iraq". MEK also gave free visit trips to its camps to the relatives of the members. According to the RAND report, the recruited members were mostly brought by MEK into Iraq illegally and then were asked to submit their identity documents for "safekeeping", an act which would "effectively trap" them. With the assistance of Saddam's government, MEK also recruited some of its members from the Iranian prisoners of the Iran-Iraq war.

Assassinations 

On 30 August 1981, a bomb was detonated killing the elected President Rajai and Premier Mohammad Javad Bahonar. Iranian authorities announced that Massoud Keshmiri, "a close aide to the late President Muhammad Ali Rajai and secretary of the Supreme Security Council, had been responsible". Keshmiri, an MEK member who was thought to have died in the explosion, "was accorded a martyr's funeral" and was "buried alongside Rajai and Bahonar".  Various MEK supporters were arrested and executed in reprisal, but Keshmiri apparently slipped through the dragnet.
The reaction to both bombings was intense with many arrests and executions of Mojahedin and other leftist groups, but "assassinations of leading officials and active supporters of the government by the Mojahedin were to continue for the next year or two". The MEK also claimed responsibility of assassinating Ali Sayad Shirazi, and Asadollah Lajevardi, director of Iran's prison system (1998). The MEK also failed to assassinate some key figures, including Iran's current leader Ali Khameni.

During the fall of 1981, the MEK was in charge of 65 percent of assassinations carried out in Iran (approximately one thousand officials of the Khomeini establishment)  including killing Mohammad Beheshti and seventy people, police officers, judges, and clerics. From 26 August 1981 to December 1982, it orchestrated 336 attacks. After the Iran regime had executed 2,500 MEK members, the group counter-attacked "against Friday-prayer leaders, revolutionary court judges and members of the IRGC". In July 1982, 13 IRGC members and Ayatollah Sadduqi, a close advisor to Khomeini were killed by Ebrahimzadeh a member of MEK who detonated a hand grenade in a suicide attack.

According to Ronen A. Cohen, the MEK saw Iran's security agencies as servants of a religious government and a cause for Iran population's state of unhappiness. The MEK first fought against the Revolutionary Guards and later against military units. Struan Stevenson and other analysts have stated that MEK targets included only the Islamic Republic's governmental and security institutions. MEK leader Massoud Rajavi stated that they did not target civilians:

According to Chris Zambelis, writing for The Jamestown Foundation, the MEK "has never been known to target civilians directly, though its use of tactics such as mortar barrages and ambushes in busy areas have often resulted in civilian casualties".

According to infoplease.com, more than 16,000 Iranian people are estimated to have been killed by the MEK since 1979, while according to the MEK, over 100,000 of its members have been killed and 150,000 imprisoned by the Islamic Republic of Iran.

Hafte Tir bombing 
The MEK is accused of detonating a bomb at the Islamic Republican Party headquarters on 28 June 1981. Two days after the incident Ruhollah Khomeini accused the MEK. The incident, called Hafte Tir bombing in Iran, killed 73, including Mohammad Beheshti, the party's secretary-general and Chief Justice of Iran, 4 cabinet ministers, 10 vice ministers and 27 members of the Parliament of Iran.

The MEK never claimed responsibility for the attack. According to Kenneth Katzman, "there has been much speculation among academics and observers that these bombings may have actually been planned by senior IRP leaders, to rid themselves of rivals within the IRP". According to Ervand Abrahamian, "whatever the truth, the Islamic Republic used the incident to wage war on the Left opposition in general and the Mojahedin in particular". According to the United States Department of State, the bombing was carried out by the MEK.

Intelligence and misinformation campaign against the MEK

The Shah's regime waged a propaganda campaign against the MEK, accusing them "of carrying out subversive acts at the behest of their foreign patrons" and claiming that "the shoot-outs and bombings caused heavy casualties among bystanders and innocent civilians, especially women and children". It also obtained "public confessions" that accused former colleagues of crimes including sexual promiscuity. The regime claimed that the MEK were "unbelievers masquerading as Muslims", and used the Quranic term "monafeqin" (hypocrites) to describe them. This label was also later used by the Islamic Republic to discredit the MEK. According to Ervand Abrahamian, the Iranian regime "did everything it could" to tarnish the MEK "through a relentless campaign by labeling them as Marxist hypocrites and Western-contaminated ‘electics’, and as ‘counter-revolutionary terrorists’ collaborating with the Iraqi Ba’thists and the imperialists". 

According to Katzman, the Iranian regime is concerned about MEK activities and are a major target of Iran's internal security apparatus and its campaign as assassinating opponents abroad. The Iranian regime is believed to be responsible for killing NCR representative in 1993, and Massoud Rajavi's brother in 1990. The MEK claims that in 1996 a shipment of Iranian mortars was intended for use by Iranian agents against Maryam Rajavi. 

After the bombing at the Imam Reza shrine in Mashhad which killed 25 and wounded at least 70 people, the Iranian regime immediately blamed the MEK. A month after the attack, a Sunni group calling itself "al-haraka al-islamiya al-iraniya" claimed responsibility for the attack. Despite this, the Iranian government continued to hold the MEK responsible for both attacks. According to the NCRI, in a trial in November 1999, interior minister Abdullah Nouri admitted that the Iranian regime had carried out the attack in order to confront the MEK and tarnish its image. According to an anonymous U.S. official, Ramzi Yousef built the bomb and MEK agents placed it in the shrine.

Yonah Alexander has stated that Ministry of Intelligence (MOIS) agents have conducted "intelligence gathering, disinformation, and subversive operations against individual regime opponents and opposition governments. [...] According to European intelligence and security services, current and former MEK members, and other dissidents, these intelligence networks shadow, harass, threaten, and ultimately, attempt to lure opposition figures and their families back to Iran for prosecution". According to him, Human Rights Watch was deceived when its 2005 report that accused the MEK of human rights abuses was based on testimonies of former MEK members working for Iran's Ministry of Intelligence.

There have also been reports that the Islamic Republic has manipulated Western media in order to generate false allegations against the MEK. In 2018, U.S. District Court charged two alleged Iran agents of "conducting covert surveillance of Israeli and Jewish facilities in the United States and collecting intelligence on Americans linked to a political organization that wants to see the current Iranian government overthrown". During the court process, it was revealed that the two alleged agents of Iran had mostly gathered information concerning activities involving the MEK. The two men pleaded guilty in November 2019 to several charges including conspiracy and "acting as an undeclared agent of the Iranian government". The Justice Department said that one of the men arrived in the US to gather "intelligence information" about the MEK (as well as Israeli and Jewish entities). The other admitted to taking photographs at a 2017 MEK rally in order to profile attendees.

In January 2020 Iranian-American Ahmadreza Mohammadi-Doostdar was sentenced by a U.S. court to 38 months in prison for conducting surveillance on American MEK members. In September 2020 The New York Times published a report where researchers alleged that opponents of the Iranian regime had been targets of a cyber attack by Iranian hackers through a variety of infiltration techniques. MEK was reportedly among the most prominent targets of the attacks.

Disinformation through recruited MEK members 

A 2001 report by the General Intelligence and Security Service said that "one of the tasks of the Iranian Ministry of Intelligence and Security (MOIS) is to track down and identify those who are in contact with opposition groups abroad. Supporters of the most important opposition group, the PMOI [MEK], are especially under scrutiny of Iranian Security Services more than any other group."  The report also said that officials of the Iranian regime place pressure on Western countries to ban the MEK in order to "destabilise the organisation and demonise the MEK in the host country and thus end their political and social activities".

A report named "People's Mojahedin of Iran" by the Federal Office for the Protection of the Constitution said that "VAVAK is directing and financing a misinformation campaign, which is also carried out through former opponents of the regime. As in previous years, the Iranian intelligence service is trying to recruit active or former members of opposition groups. This in many cases is done by threats to use force against them or their families living in Iran." A 2005 report added that "for collecting information and spying activities, Iran's intelligence service (MOIS) uses a network of agents who have defected from these organizations."

A December 2012 report by the US library of Congress's Federal Research Division profiling the MOIS describes how the MOIS recruited former MEK members and "used them to launch a disinformation campaign against the MEK". MOIS has also been known to recruit and extort non-Iranians to demonize the MEK.

The Islamic Republic of Iran has also been known to kidnap and torture captured MEK members and their families. In 2009, activists and MEK supporter Farzad and Sabham Madadzadeh were arrested by Iranian police. According to Farzad, Iranian officers tortured him and his sister, and wanted him to confess to crimes that he had not committed: "They told me, 'You come and do an interview against the PMOI, the MEK, and the NCRI [...]. They would throw me on the ground and treat me like a football between three people. [...] Several times they did this to me in front of Shabnam's eyes in order to break her".

Targeting of MEK members outside Iran

From 1989 to 1993, the Islamic Republic of Iran carried out numerous assassinations of MEK members. Between March and June 1990, three MEK members were assassinated in Turkey. On 24 February 1990, Dr Kazem Rajavi (a National Council member) was assassinated in Geneva. In January 1993, an MEK member was murdered in Baghdad.

In March 1993, the NCRI's spokesman was murdered in Italy. In May 1990, a MEK member was murdered in Cologne. In February 1993, a MEK member was murdered in Manila. In April 1992, a MEK member was murdered in the Netherlands. In August 1992, a MEK member was murdered in Karachi. In March 1993, two assassins on motorcycles murdered NCRI representative Mohammad Hossein Naqdi in Italy. This led to the European Parliament issuing a condemnation of the Islamic Republic of Iran for political murder.

In May 1994, Islamic Republic agents assassinated two MEK members in Iraq. In May 1995, five MEK members were assassinated in Iraq. In 1996, two MEK members were murdered in Turkey (including NCRI member Zahra Rajabi); in the same year two MEK members were killed in Pakistan and another one in Iraq.

On 23 September 1991, an attempt was carried out to assassinate Massoud Rajavi in Baghdad. In August 1992, a MEK member was kidnapped and brought to Iran. In September 1992, MEK offices in Baghdad were broken into. In January 1993, a MEK bus was bombed without casualties. Towards the end of 1993, anonymous gunmen attacked Air France offices and the French embassy in Iran after France allowed Maryam Rajavi and 200 MEK members to enter France.

Islamic Republic of Iran allegations against the MEK

Execution of Mohammad-Reza Sa'adati 

In 1979, engineer Mohammad-Reza Sa'adati was arrested by Iranian security forces outside the Soviet embassy and charged with spying on behalf of the Soviet Union. Revolutionary Guards detained him while trying to enter the Soviet Embassy reportedly carrying sensitive documents about the Revolutionary Council. According to historian Abbas Milani, the MEK had informed the Soviets that they had obtained the documents and case of Ahmad Moggarrebi, an Imperial Iranian Army general who was executed for espionage for the Soviets by the Shah's regime.

The MEK claimed that Sa’adati, who was responsible for foreign relations on behalf of the MEK, had only interviewed officials from various nations and organizations, and had been arrested on false charges. Sa’adati also accused the Iranian regime of trying to link MEK operations to the Soviet Union. Sa'adati was tried and sentenced to serve ten years in prison. In June 1981 when conflicts escalated between the MEK and Khomeini's government, Sa'adati was retried and executed by the Islamic Republic of Iran for "allegedly managing the guerrilla war from inside the prison".

1992 attacks 
In April 1992, Iranian authorities carried out an air raid against MEK bases in Iraq. The IRI claimed that the attack had been in retaliation to the MEK targeting Iranian governmental and civilian targets. The MEK and Iraq denied the allegations, claiming that Iran had "invented this attack on its territory to cover up the bombardment of the Mojahedin bases on Iraqi territory".

Other 

On 9 February 2012, Mohammad-Javad Larijani, then senior aide to Ayatollah Ali Khamenei, alleged that Mossad and the MEK has been jointly responsible for the targeted killing of Iranian scientists.

On 19 June 2017, the Alborz Central Prosecutor and Revolutionary Prosecutor announced the arrests of two people in Karaj in connection with the Mojahedin Khalq Organization. Those arrested confessed to have received money from the MEK for gathering information and pictures of the elections.

As Ali Shamkhani, national security chief mentioned in the saying to members of parliament the "Mujahedin-e-Khalq was behind the protests" which raised after increasing the price of petrol. Arab News reported that "key organizers of recent protests could be said to be associates of this oppositional group (MEK)". Tehran has criticised the United States for "failure to condemn and disarm the MEK".

In January 2018, Iranian President Hassan Rouhani phoned French president Emmanuel Macron, asking him to order kicking the MEK out of its base in Auvers-sur-Oise, alleging that the MEK stirred up the 2017–18 Iranian protests.

On 27 November 2020, Iran's top nuclear scientist Mohsen Fakhrizadeh was assassinated. Iranian official, Rear Admiral Ali Shamkhani, who heads the Supreme National Security Council, blamed Mujahideen-e-Khalq and Israel. for the attack.

Ties to foreign and non-state actors 

MEK was among the opposition groups receiving supports from Gulf nations such as Saudi Arabia.

On 7 January 1986, the MEK leaders sent a twelve-page letter to the "comrades" of Central Committee of the Communist Party of the Soviet Union, asking for temporary asylum and a loan of $300 million to continue their "revolutionary anti-imperialist" actions. It is not clear how the Soviets responded, according to Milani. Israel's foreign intelligence agency Mossad maintains connections with the MEK, dating back to the 1990s.

Hyeran Jo, associate professor of Texas A&M University wrote in 2015 that the MEK is supported by the United States. According to Spiegel Online security experts say that U.S., Saudi Arabia and Israel provide the group with financial support, though there is no proof for this supposition and MEK denies this.

While dealing with anti-regime clergy in 1974, the MEK became close with secular Left groups in and outside Iran. These included the confederation of Iranian Students, The People's Democratic Republic of Yemen, and the People's Front for the Liberation of Oman, among others. The MEK sent five trained members into South Yemen to fight in the Dhofar Rebellion against Omani and Iranian forces. Until 2001, the MEK received support from the Taliban.

In April 2012, journalist Seymour Hersh reported that the U.S. Joint Special Operations Command had trained MEK operatives at a secret site in Nevada from 2005 to 2009. According to Hersh, MEK members were trained in intercepting communications, cryptography, weaponry and small unit tactics at the Nevada site up until President Barack Obama took office in 2009.

Intelligence and operational capabilities 

During the years MEK was based in Iraq, it was closely associated with the intelligence service Mukhabarat (IIS), and even had a dedicated department in the agency. Directorate 14 of the IIS worked with the MEK in joint operations while Directorate 18 was exclusively responsible for the MEK and issued the orders and tasks for their operations. The MEK offered IIS with intelligence it gathered from Iran, interrogation and translation services.

A 2008 report by the United States Army Intelligence Center, states that the MEK operates a HUMINT network within Iran, which is "clearly a MEK core strength". It has started a debate among intelligence experts that "whether western powers should leverage this capability to better inform their own intelligence picture of the Iranian regime's goals and intentions". Rick Francona told Foreign Policy in 2005 that the MEK teams could work in conjunction with collection of intelligence and identifying agents. U.S. security officials maintain that the organization has a record of exaggerating or fabricating information, according to Newsweek. David Kay believes that "they're often wrong, but occasionally they give you something".

American government sources told Newsweek in 2005 that the Pentagon is hoping to utilize MEK members as informants or give them training as spies for use against Tehran.

The MEK is able to conduct "telephone intelligence" operations effectively, i.e. gathering intelligence through making phone calls to officials and government organizations in Iran. According to Ariane Tabatabai, the MEK's "capabilities to conduct terrorist attacks may have decreased in recent years".

Propaganda and social media 
The MEK's first act of counter-propaganda was to release about 2014 Iranian prisoners of war within a period of 9 months. It started on 11 March 1986 when the NLA released 370 prisoners of war. They then released 170 prisoners of war in November 1987 that had been captured by the NLA. A third wave of 1300 prisoners of war were released in August 1988, with some joining the NLA ranks. During the last release, Massoud Rajavi promoted it this as an act of compassion by the NCRI, which was in contrast to the Islamic Republic's "cruel manner of treating" prisoners of war. According to Wilfried Buchta, the MEK has used propaganda in the West since the 1980s. In the 1980s and the 1990s, their propaganda was mainly targeted against the officials in the establishment. According to Anthony H. Cordesman, since the mid-1980s the MEK has confronted Iranian representatives overseas through "propaganda and street demonstrations". Other analysts have also alleged that there is a propaganda campaign by the MEK in the West, including Christopher C. Harmon, Wilfried Buchta, and others.

According to Kenneth Katzman, the MEK is able to mobilize its exile supporters in demonstration and fundraising campaigns. The organization attempts to publicize regime abuses and curb foreign governments’ relations with Tehran. To do so, it frequently conducts anti-regime marches and demonstrations in those countries.

A 1986 U.S. State Department letter to KSCI-TV described "MEK propaganda" as being in line with the following: "[T]he Iranian government is bad, the PMOI is against the Iranian government, the Iranian government represses the PMOI, therefore, the PMOI and its leader Rajavi are good and worth of support". According to Masoud Kazemzadeh, the MEK has also used propaganda against defectors of the organization.

Al Jazeera reported on an alleged Twitter-based MEK campaign. According to Exeter University lecturer Marc Owen Jones, accounts tweeting #FreeIran and #Iran_Regime_Change "were created within about a four-month window", suggesting bot activity.

In an article published by The Intercept on 9 June 2019, two former MEK members claimed that "Heshmat Alavi" is not a real person, and that the articles published under that name were actually written by a team of people at the political wing of MEK. Alavi contributed to several media outlets including Forbes, The Diplomat, The Hill, The Daily Caller, The Federalist and the English edition of Al Arabiya's website. According to The Intercept, one of Alavi's articles published by Forbes was used by the White House to justify Donald Trump Administration's sanctions against Iran. Since the article's publication, Twitter has suspended the "Heshmat Alavi" account, and the writings in the name of "Heshmat Alavi" were removed from The Diplomat and Forbes website. A website purported to be a personal blog of "Heshmat Alavi" published a post with counterclaims saying that their Twitter account had been suspended.

Human rights record 
In 2006, Iraqi Prime Minister Al-Maliki told the MEK it had to leave Iraq, but the MEK responded that the "request violated their status under the Geneva Convention". Al-Maliki and the Iraqi Ministry of Justice maintained that the MEK had committed human rights abuses in the early 1990s when it aided Saddam Hussain's campaign against the Shia uprising. According to Time magazine, the MEK has denied aiding Saddam in quashing Kurdish and Shia rebellions.

In May 2005, Human Rights Watch (HRW) issued a report named "No Exit: Human Rights Abuses Inside the MKO Camps", describing prison camps run by the MEK and severe human rights violations committed by the group against its members, ranging from prolonged incommunicado and solitary confinement to beatings, verbal and psychological abuse, coerced confessions, threats of execution, and torture that in two cases led to death. However, disagreements over this provided evidence has been expressed.

In a letter of May 2005 to HRW, the senior US military police commander responsible for the Camp Ashraf area, Brigadier General David Phillips, who had been in charge during 2004 for the protective custody of the MEK members in the camp, disputed the alleged human rights violations.

Former American military officers who had aided in guarding the MEK camp in Iraq gave differing accounts: Three of them suggested by MeK said "its members had been free to leave since American military began protecting it in 2003."  Brig. Gen. David Phillips said they had not found any prison or torture facilities. Captain Woodside who was not one of those who MEK suggested, said that US officers did not have regular access to camp buildings, or to group members "whose relatives said they were held by force", and that it was difficult for members (especially women) to leave.

Human Rights Watch released a statement in February 2006, stating: "We have investigated with care the criticisms we received concerning the substance and methodology of the [No Exit] report, and find those criticisms to be unwarranted". It provided responses to the FOFI document, whose findings "have no relevance" to the HRW report.

In July 2013, the United Nations special envoy to Iraq, Martin Kobler, accused the leaders the group of human rights abuses, an allegation the MEK dismissed as "baseless" and "cover-up". The United Nations spokesperson defended Kobler and his allegations, stating: "We regret that MEK and its supporters continue to focus on public distortions of the U.N.'s efforts to promote a peaceful, humanitarian solution on Camp Ashraf and, in particular, its highly personalized attacks on the U.N. envoy for Iraq".

Jo Hyeran, in her work examining humanitarian violations of rebel groups to international law, states that the MEK has not accepted International Committee of the Red Cross (ICRC) visits to its detention centers. 
According to criticism of Human Right groups, marriage had been banned in the camp.
Upon entry into the group, new members are indoctrinated in ideology and a revisionist history of Iran. All members are required to participate in weekly "ideologic cleansings".
Journalist Jason Rezaian remarked in his detailing the connections between John R. Bolton and the MEK that "the few who were able to escape" were "cut off from their loved ones, forced into arranged marriages, brainwashed, sexually abused, and tortured".

Members who defected from the MEK and some experts say that these Mao-style self-criticism sessions are intended to enforce control over sex and marriage in the organization as a total institution. MEK denied the brainwashing claims and described the former members as Iranian spies, also saying that "any cult' comparisons were coming from the Iranian regime as part of its 'misinformation campaign.'"

According to Abbas Milani, lobbyists paid for by the Iranian regime campaigned against delisting the MEK calling it a "dangerous cult".
Some MEK defectors have accused the MEK of human rights abuses, while the MEK has denied these claims saying they are part of a misinformation campaign by the Iranian regime.
In March 2019 a Hamburg court ruled that Der Spiegel had "acted illegally in publishing false allegations of 'torture' and 'terrorist training' by the MEK in Albania". In July 2020 a German court ordered the Frankfurter Allgemeine Zeitung to remove false information about the MEK including untrue reports of human rights abuses by the MEK against its members.

Fundraising 
In Germany, the MEK used a NGO to "support asylum seekers and refugees". Another alleged organization collected funds for "children whose parents had been killed in Iran" in sealed and stamped boxes placed in city centers. According to the Netjang Society, in 1988, the Nuremberg MEK front organization was uncovered by police. Initially, The Greens supported these organizations while it was unaware of their purpose.

According to some sources, Saddam Hussein provided millions of dollars from the United Nations' Oil-for-Food program to the MEK.

In December 2001, a joint FBI-Cologne police operation discovered what a 2004 report calls "a complex fraud scheme involving children and social benefits", involving the sister of Maryam Rajavi. The High Court ruled to close several MEK compounds after investigations revealed that the organization fraudulently collected between $5 million and $10 million in social welfare benefits for children of its members sent to Europe.

In 2003, General Intelligence and Security Service (AIVD) claimed that Netherland charity that raises money for "children who suffer under the Iranian regime" (SIM) was fundraising for the MEK. A spokesperson for the charity said that SIM was unrelated to the MEK, and that these allegations were "lies from the Iranian regime".

It also operated a UK-based charity, Iran Aid, which "claimed to raise money for Iranian refugees persecuted by the Islamic regime" and was later revealed to be a front for its military wing (according to conversations at the Nejat Society). In 2001, the Charity Commission for England and Wales closed it down after finding no "verifiable links between the money donated by the British public [approximately £5 million annually] and charitable work in Iran".

As RAND Corporation policy reported, MEK supporters seek donations at public places, often showing "gruesome pictures" of human rights victims in Iran and claiming to raise money for them but funnelling it to MEK. A 2004 report by Federal Bureau of Investigation (FBI) states that the organization is engaged "through a complex international money laundering operation that uses accounts in Turkey, Germany, France, Belgium, Norway, Sweden, Jordan, and the United Arab Emirates".

In 1999, after a 2 1⁄2-year investigation, Federal authorities arrested 29 individuals in Operation Eastern Approach, of whom 15 were held on charges of helping MEK members illegally enter the United States. The ringleader was pleaded guilty to providing phony documents to MEK members and violation of Antiterrorism and Effective Death Penalty Act of 1996.

On 19 November 2004, two front organizations called the Iranian–American Community of Northern Virginia and the Union Against Fundamentalism organized demonstrations in front of the Capitol building in Washington, DC and transferred funds for the demonstration, some $9,000 to the account of a Texas MEK member. Congress and the bank in question were not aware that the demonstrators were actually providing material support to the MEK.

Perception

Inside Iran

The RAND Corporation policy report on the group suggests that between 1979 and 1981 it was the most popular dissident group in Iran, however, the former reputation is diminished to the extent that it is now "the only entity less popular" than the Iranian government. Certain sources have cited the MEK's collaboration with Saddam Hussain as diminishing the MEK's standing inside Iran. Ronen Cohen agrees that MEK's popularity decreased because it sided with Iraq, but adds that this is hard to prove "because of the nature of the government in Iran". Other analysts cite the group being "unpopular among Iranians" for "attacks on Iranian soldiers and civilians". According to Struan Stevenson: "The claim that the [MEK] is an irrelevant group or has no support within Iran is a myth". After the 1979 Iranian revolution, Ervand Abrahamian says the MEK gained significant support from the Iranian public, becoming a leading opposition to Khomeini's theocratic regime. Even though the MEK still asserts that it has significant support, Ervand Abrahamian says the MEK's popularity "plummeted after becoming more violent in the early 1980s".

Inside Iran, the strength of the MEK is uncertain since many of its supporters have been executed, tortured, or jailed. In 2004, Amnesty International claimed a man named Hojjat Zamani accused of aiding the PMOI had been forcibly returned to Iran from Turkey and disappeared. In 2018, Amnesty condemned the government of Iran for executing MEK prisoners in 1988 and presented the MEK as being mainly peaceful political dissidents.

According to Abrahamian, by 1981 many foreign diplomats considered MEK to be "the largest, the best disciplined, and the most heavily armed of all the opposition organizations". Karim Sadjadpour believes the MEK is a "fringe group with mysterious benefactors that garners scant support in its home country", and that the population of its supporters in Iran "hovers between negligible and nill". Kenneth Katzman wrote in 2001 that the MEK is "Iran's most active opposition group". A 2009 report published by the Brookings Institution notes that the organization appears to be undemocratic and lacking popularity but maintains an operational presence in Iran, acting as a proxy against Tehran. According to Ilan Berman, MEK's supporters consider the group to be "the most organized and disciplined" opposition group, while its detractors regard it as a "fringe" element. The group has been described as Iran's main political opposition group.

By other Iranian opposition parties 
The group kept a friendly relationship with the only other major Iranian urban guerrilla group, the Organization of Iranian People's Fedai Guerrillas (OIPFG). An October 1994 report by the U.S. Department of State notes that other Iranian opposition groups do not cooperate with the organization because they view it as "undemocratic" and "tightly controlled" by its leaders. In 1994 rival exiled groups question the organizations's claim that it would hold free elections after taking power in Iran, pointing to its designation of a "president-elect" as an evidence of neglecting Iranian people.

Due to its anti-Shah stance before the revolution, the MEK is not close to monarchist opposition groups and Reza Pahlavi, Iran's deposed crown prince. Commenting on the MEK, Pahlavi said in an interview: "I cannot imagine Iranians ever forgiving their behavior at that time [siding with Saddam Hussein's Iraq in the Iran-Iraq war]. [...] If the choice is between this regime and the MEK, they will most likely say the mullahs".

Iran's deposed president Abolhassan Banisadr ended his alliance with the group in 1984, denouncing its stance during the Iran–Iraq War.

The National Resistance Movement of Iran (NAMIR), led by Shapour Bakhtiar, never maintained a friendly relationship with the MEK. In July 1981, NAMIR rejected any notion of cooperation between the two organizations and publicly condemned them in a communiqué issued following the meeting between
Iraqi Foreign Minister, Tariq Aziz and Rajavi in January 1983 as well as the "Holy and Revolutionary" nature of Rajavis in April 1984.

Documentary films 
 A Cult That Would Be an Army: Cult of the Chameleon (2007): Al Jazeera documentary directed by Maziar Bahari.
 The Strange World of the People's Mujahedin (2012): BBC World Service documentary directed by Owen Bennett-Jones and produced by Wisebuddah company. It won New York Festivals award for Best Investigative Report in 2013.
 Chasing Iranian Spies: documentary directed by Michael Ware as an episode of the Uncensored with Michael Ware (S1E3), aired on 7 February 2017 by the National Geographic.

Series, films and documentaries by the Islamic Republic of Iran on the MEK 
 Comrades in Arms: Ashraf Camp in Iraq Turned into a Harem for Leader (2014): Press TV documentary.
 The Secrets Behind Auvers-sur-Oise (2016): Press TV documentary.
Handwritings: The 1987 action, Drama, Thriller film was directed by Mehrzad Minui, based on scenario of Behrouz Afkhami.
 The Wolves: four-part eight-houred documentary series initially released in 2007 and reissued in 2013 as a 90-minutes documentary, aired by the Islamic Republic of Iran Broadcasting. It includes footage from Ba'athist Iraq archives of confidential top-level meetings.
 An Unfinished Film for My Daughter, Somayeh: 2014 documentary directed by Morteza Payeshenas, aired by the Islamic Republic of Iran Broadcasting. Somayeh Mohammadi said that the videos and photos used in the documentary were "given to the regime's intelligence to make a documentary against PMOI."
 The Insider: 2008 feature film directed by Ahmad Kaveri and starring Amir Jafari as an MEK defector who returns to Iran in 2004.
 Cyanide: 2016 feature film directed by Behrouz Shoaibi which portrays the organization during the 1970s. The cast includes Babak Hamidian, Behnoosh Tabatabaei, Hanieh Tavassoli, Atila Pesyani, Mehdi Hashemi and Hamed Komeili.
 Mina's Choice: 2016 drama about happy marriage of couple Mina and Mehran which tears apart. According to the director Kamal Tabrizi and producer Manouchehr Mohammadi, the film intends to "give warnings to families" about the MEK.
 The Midday Event: 2017 political drama directed by Mohammad-Hossein Mahdavian, it features the MEK during the 1980s and was named the best film in the 35th Fajr International Film Festival.
 The Gift of Darkness: 2011 drama series directed by Jalil Saman features the MEK during the 1980s.
 Parvaneh: 2013 drama series directed by Jalil Saman about the MEK during the 1970s.
 Nafas: 2017 drama series directed by Jalil Saman features 1970s.
 Trace of blood, second season of "The Midday Event", political drama directed by Mohammad-Hossein Mahdavian, it features the MEK during Operation Mersad and was awarded in the 37th Fajr International Film Festival.

See also 

 Trial of Hamid Nouri
 List of cults of personality
 Guerrilla groups of Iran
 Order of battle during the Iran–Iraq War
 Organizations of the Iranian Revolution
 List of works about the People's Mujahedin of Iran

References

Notes

Citations

Sources

Further reading

External links

 
1965 establishments in Iran
Banned political parties in Iran
Cults of personality
Entities added to the Consolidated List by Australia
Factions in the Iraq War
Foreign relations during the Iran–Iraq War
France–Iran relations
Guerrilla organizations
Iran–Iraq relations
Iran–Israel relations
Iran–Saudi Arabia relations
Iran–Soviet Union relations
Iran–United States relations
Iranian nationalism
Islamic organizations established in 1965
Islamic political parties in Iran
Islamic socialist political parties
Left-wing militant groups in Iran
Left-wing nationalist parties
Left-wing populism
Militant opposition to the Islamic Republic of Iran
Militant opposition to the Pahlavi dynasty
National Council of Resistance of Iran
Organizations based in Asia designated as terrorist
Organisations designated as terrorist by Iran
Organizations designated as terrorist by Iraq
Organizations formerly designated as terrorist by Canada
Organizations formerly designated as terrorist by the European Union
Organisations formerly designated as terrorist by the United Kingdom
Organizations formerly designated as terrorist by the United States
Organizations of the 1991 uprisings in Iraq
Political parties established in 1965
Political parties of the Iranian Revolution
Populism in Iran
Syncretic political movements